TransAdelaide was a publicly owned corporation established on 4 July 1994 which provided suburban train, tram and bus services in Adelaide, South Australia, under contract to the Government of South Australia. It took over these responsibilities from the State Transport Authority.

TransAdelaide operated local bus services in Adelaide until 22 April 2000. All metropolitan bus routes have since been transferred to private companies Light-City Buses, SouthLink and Torrens Transit.

TransAdelaide continued to operate rail services under the Adelaide Metro brand. TransAdelaide was abolished on 31 August 2010 with its staff and functions were transferred to the newly created Office of the Rail Commissioner.

TransAdelaide operated all suburban railway services in Adelaide on the Belair, Gawler, Grange, Noarlunga Centre, Outer Harbor and Tonsley lines.

After retiring the last of the aging Redhen railcars in 1996, TransAdelaide operated 99 broad-gauge diesel railcars, split into two classes and four types, the diesel-hydraulic 2000/2100 class and the diesel-electric 3000/3100 class. All were maintained by Bombardier Transportation at a central depot adjacent to Adelaide station.

TransAdelaide also operated the Glenelg tram line.

Fleet table

Past fleet

TransAdelaide inherited some Redhen railcars from the State Transport Authority. The final units were retired in October 1996.

Type H trams were the mainstay of the Glenelg tram line for the 77 years between the line being converted from a steam railway to electrified tramway operation in 1929 and the trams' retirement in 2006. They were replaced by Bombardier Flexity Classic and Alstom Citadis low-floor trams, which now also run on an extension of the line through Adelaide city centre.

References

Rail transport in South Australia
Passenger railway companies of Australia
Transport in Adelaide
Public transport in South Australia
Railway companies established in 1994
Railway companies disestablished in 2010
Australian companies established in 1994
Australian companies disestablished in 2010